Tierno Bokar, full name Tierno Bokar Saalif Tall (1875 – 1939), was a Malian mystic, Sufi sage, and a Muslim spiritual teacher of the early twentieth century famous for his message of religious tolerance and universal love.

Life
Tierno Bokar was born in Segou, Mali, in 1875. Bokar was the son of Salif (a Tukolor prince) and Aissata. His grandfather, Seydou Hann, was respected as a great Sufi mystic. As a child, Bokar was educated in the Tijani Order. By the age of 15, Tierno had memorized most of the Koran, Islamic rituals and laws, and the lives of many saints. In 1890, Bokar's father left his family in Segou in order to continue to fight against the French as Segou fell into French hands without resistance. Bokar moved with his mother to the village of Bandiagara in 1893. At the age of 18, he studied under Amadou Tafsir Ba, who introduced him to the secrets of the thought of the Tijani founder, Shaykh Ahmad al-Tijani.  After his education was complete Ba requested that Bokar take over his school, but Bokar refused to be anything more than Ba's assistant until Ba died.  At the age of 26 he married Nene Amadou Thiam. When he was 33 his teacher passed, and he became the leader of his own school.

Daily Schedule 
Tierno Bokar led his school for 29 years, and during its heyday taught almost 200 students. He kept a simple schedule so repetitive that at any time of the day it could be known where he was. He woke up every morning at 3 am and prayed until dawn. At dawn he would go from hut to hut calling the people to first prayer. Tierno Bokar did not lead the prayer, but would mingle afterwards with those who had attended. After the prayer he would spend some time in meditation, then head home (the school was centered in his home) where he would have breakfast with his students. The students would then be separated by their levels of learning in the courtyard and the lessons would begin. The morning would be dedicated to the Koran first, after which the law and commentaries would be studied until the second meal and second prayer of the day. After the second prayer teaching would continue until the mid-afternoon prayer (third prayer), after which the students were dismissed to handle their own business. Tierno recited his rosary until the sunset prayer (fourth prayer) at the mosque, where he would remain until the nightfall prayer (fifth prayer). After that he would visit his friends and family for enjoyment and social interaction until it was time for sleep.

Persecution and Death 
In 1937, Tierno Bokar visited and became a follower of Cherif Hammallah in Nioro du Sahel.

A disagreement over the proper number of repetitions for a Sufi prayer (Hamallayya prescribed 11 times as opposed to 12) rose dramatically in scale. The difference in repetitions held little to no religious significance but due to historical factors was associated with rival clans. Intense infighting among rival clans and religious factions in French Sudan, as well as involvement of the French colonial authority eventually led to massacres and the exile of Hammallah. Tierno Bokar followed 11 repetitions in his prayer for religious reasons but many members of his clan viewed it as a deep betrayal due to the prayer being associated with a rival clan. In Bandiagara, Bokar was ostracized by his clan and family and forbidden to teach or pray publicly.  Bokar's school was destroyed and he and his two wives and children were placed under house arrest.

Bokar died in Bandiagara in 1939, where he is buried in the cemetery "at his mother’s feet, under a small tree".

Religious Teaching

The Soul 
Tierno Bokar describes the Primordial Pact between the soul and God. Bokar taught that each person was created in the image of Adam and was given a soul. The soul is the most precious gift that God bestows. It is the soul that separates humans from animals. It is the soul that allows us to mentally make connections and understand religion and the world. It is also the soul that allows us to understand The Book (Quran), the Tradition (Sunnah) and the Consensus (Ijma).  Those who dedicated their soul to the religion is promised an increase and a reward in the Hereafter (Paradise). Those who dedicate their soul to the material world will bring great harm towards themselves in the Hereafter (Jahannam). 

Bokar taught that no matter how rigorous the trials around Paradise, the torments of hell is worse. No matter how pleasurable the things around Hell, Paradise is better. Therefore, undergoing a momentary trial for eternal bliss is better than enjoying momentary bliss and suffering perpetual torment.

Religious tolerance 
Bokar believed that there was on only one true Religion with unchangeable principles but varying expressions corresponding to the time and place that the Religion is revealed. Bokar stated that this Religion is the religion taught by the great prophets but most people only understand the outward forms of the religion thus leading separate "religions" to conflict with each other. Bokar cited several Quranic verses (Quran 2:136, Quran 2:62, Quran 30:30) to explain this concept. 

Tierno Bokar advocated for civil inter-religious dialogue (Quran 16:125, Quran 29:46) and admonished religious bigotry or chauvinism of any kind. Tierno Bokar stated that "Certain truths only seem to be beyond our acceptance because, quite simply, our knowledge has not had access to them". He also advised his students to "Avoid confrontations, when something in some religion or belief shocks you, instead seek to understand it. Perhaps God will come to your aid and will enlighten you about what seems strange to you."

Throughout the increasingly violent fighting, Bokar preached a message of religious tolerance and universal love.

Fame
A book written by a pupil of his, Amadou Hampâté Bâ, entitled Vie et enseignement de Tierno Bokar: Le sage de Bandiagara (translated into English as A Spirit of Tolerance: The Inspiring Life of Tierno Bokar) introduced Bokar to the non-African world. The book was originally published in 1957, under the title Tierno Bokar: Le Sage de Bandiagara, with co-author Marcel Cardaire.
Bokar's life story was later made into a play directed by Peter Brook entitled Tierno Bokar.
Brook made the story of prayer repetitions into another play, entitled 11 & 12, which ran at the Barbican Centre (London) in early 2010.
The poet Maabal described Bokar with the following poem:

See also
Amadou Hampâté Bâ
A Spirit of Tolerance: The Inspiring Life of Tierno Bokar

Notes

References

External links

 
 

People of French West Africa
Malian Sufis
1875 births
1939 deaths
People from Ségou